Seymour "Cy" Chermak (September 20, 1929 – January 29, 2021) was an American producer and screenwriter. He is best known for producing CHiPs, Ironside, and Kolchak: The Night Stalker.

Career 
Chermak started his career at the age of 17.

From 1950 - 1954, Chermak was head writer for the new DuMont Television Network crime drama television series Rocky King Detective. He wrote the screenplay for the 1959 film 4D Man. 

In 1967, he became an executive producer for the new NBC crime drama television series Ironside.

In 1971, Chermak was nominated for a Primetime Emmy for his work on Ironside. He would go on to write and produce several television programs, including Kolchak: The Night Stalker, Barbary Court, Murder at the World Series,  and spinoff television series Amy Prentiss. In 1978, he became a producer for the new NBC series CHiPs. He would go on to produce 125 episodes of the show.

In 1998, Chermak was a screenwriter for the television film Rescuers: Stories of Courage: Two Families. He wrote the script with his wife, Francine Carroll, for which they were nominated for a Writers Guild of America Award.

In 2016, Chermak wrote the book The Show Runner: An Insider's Guide to Successful Television Production.

Death 
Chermak died on January 29, 2021, at the age of 91, at his home in Honolulu, Hawaii, of natural causes.

References

External links 

1929 births
2021 deaths
American television writers
People from Bayonne, New Jersey
Television producers from New Jersey